Ladies Love Outlaws may refer to:

 Ladies Love Outlaws (Waylon Jennings album), 1972
 Ladies Love Outlaws (Tom Rush album), 1974